Heterodera cacti is a plant pathogenic nematode affecting cacti.

See also 
 List of foliage plant diseases (Cactaceae)

External links 
 Nemaplex, University of California - Heterodera cacti

cacti
Plant pathogenic nematodes
Ornamental plant pathogens and diseases
Cacti